Josep "Pepe" Oriola Vila (born 9 July 1994) is a Spanish racing driver. He became the youngest driver to race in the World Touring Car Championship when he competed in the 2011 season. Oriola is not only the youngest driver to start a WTCC race at the age of 16, he’s also the youngest to be on the podium and to have won a race. Feats he achieved in Brazil in 2011 and Morocco in 2013 respectively. His record of being the youngest driver ever to compete, score championship points and win a race in the prestigious WTCC remains to this day. In 2018 he competed in the World Touring Car Cup and finish 6th in a close title fight till the last rounds in Macau. In 2019 he switches from factory driver of CUPRA to Hyundai Motorsport. Oriola also won the 1st ever 24h race of only TCR Cars in Spa Francorchamps in 2019 with the team Red Camel-Jordans. He is part of the team Changan Ford in China Touring Car Championship CTCC where in 2019 won 3 races.

Career

Early years
Born in Barcelona, Oriola began his career in karting in 2004 at the age of nine. He switched to touring cars at the end of 2009 at the age of 15 when he competed in the final round of the SEAT León Supercopa Spain, finishing on the podium. In 2010 he competed in full seasons of both the Spanish Supercopa and SEAT León Eurocup with the Monlau Competition team. He took his first victory at the second Eurocup race at Brands Hatch, which was shortened due to a heavy accident involving Francisco Carvalho. He then took a double victory at the season finale at Valencia to move up to fourth in the final Eurocup standings. He also finished fourth in the Supercopa standings.

World Touring Car Championship
In 2011 Oriola raced a SEAT León in the World Touring Car Championship for Sunred Engineering. He became the youngest ever driver in the series when he made his debut, aged 16 years, 8 months and 11 days at the 2011 FIA WTCC Race of Brazil. He scored his first points in the second race of the season at Curitiba.

Oriola will continue in the WTCC in 2012, staying with Sunred but now racing under the Tuenti Racing Team banner. He left the first round in Italy in a three way tie for first place in the Yokohama Trophy with Stefano D'Aste and Alex MacDowall, having started from the class pole position in race one. He took his first overall podium finish in race two of the Race of Portugal. Oriola spent much of the season at the top of the Yokohama Trophy but dropped behind Norbert Michelisz in the standings after the Race of Brazil. He took his second podium finish of the season in race two of the Race of Japan with second place behind Stefano D'Aste having started from that position on the reversed grid.

Oriola stayed in the WTCC for the 2013 season driving for the Tuenti Racing Team. He would not be eligible for the Yokohama Trophy as the team was now run by SEAT Sport. At the season opening Race of Italy he qualified fourth as the best placed SEAT driver on the grid. He retired from race one with a puncture having been running fifth and finished sixth in race two.
On 7 April 2013 at the Race of Morocco he became the youngest person to win a WTCC race when he claimed victory in race two. After the Race of Russia, Oriola confirmed he would be switching to a Chevrolet Cruze car for the following round in Portugal.

Racing record

Complete World Touring Car Championship results
(key) (Races in bold indicate pole position) (Races in italics indicate fastest lap)

† Driver did not finish the race, but was classified as he completed over 75% of the race distance.

Complete TCR International Series results
(key) (Races in bold indicate pole position) (Races in italics indicate fastest lap)

† Driver did not finish the race, but was classified as he completed over 90% of the race distance.

Complete World Touring Car Cup results
(key) (Races in bold indicate pole position) (Races in italics indicate fastest lap)

† Driver did not finish the race, but was classified as he completed over 90% of the race distance.

TCR Spa 500 results

Complete TCR Europe Touring Car Series results
(key) (Races in bold indicate pole position) (Races in italics indicate fastest lap)

References

External links

 Official website
 

1994 births
Living people
Racing drivers from Barcelona
Spanish racing drivers
SEAT León Eurocup drivers
European Touring Car Cup drivers
World Touring Car Championship drivers
TCR International Series drivers
World Touring Car Cup drivers
24H Series drivers
Campos Racing drivers
TCR Asia Series drivers
KCMG drivers
Craft-Bamboo Racing drivers
TCR Europe Touring Car Series drivers